Chassigny is a commune in the Haute-Marne department in north-eastern France. It is known for the Chassigny meteorite.

Demographics

See also
Communes of the Haute-Marne department

References

External links

Communes of Haute-Marne